Stanley Kgatla (born 13 September 1982 in Tzaneen) is a South African association football midfielder for Premier Soccer League clubs and South Africa.

External links
 

1982 births
Living people
People from Tzaneen
Soccer players from Limpopo
South African soccer players
South Africa international soccer players
2005 CONCACAF Gold Cup players
Association football midfielders
Winners Park F.C. players
Platinum Stars F.C. players
AmaZulu F.C. players
Mpumalanga Black Aces F.C. players
Highlands Park F.C. players